The Disability Discrimination Act 2005 (c 13) is an Act of the Parliament of the United Kingdom.

Section 20 - Short title, interpretation, commencement and extent
The following orders have been made under section 20(3):
The Disability Discrimination Act 2005 (Commencement No. 1) Order 2005 (S.I. 2005/1676 (C. 70))
The Disability Discrimination Act 2005 (Commencement No. 2) Order 2005 (S.I. 2005/2774 (C. 113))
The Disability Discrimination Act 2005 (Commencement No 3) Order 2007 (S.I. 2007/1555 (C. 63))
The Disability Discrimination Act 2005 (Commencement No. 4) Order 2010 (S.I. 2010/341 (C. 27))
The Disability Discrimination Act 2005 (Commencement No. 1) (Wales) Order 2007 (S.I. 2007/3285 (W. 289))

References
Halsbury's Statutes,

External links
The Disability Discrimination Act 2005, as amended from the National Archives.
The Disability Discrimination Act 2005, as originally enacted from the National Archives.
Explanatory notes to the Disability Discrimination Act 2005.

United Kingdom Acts of Parliament 2005
Disability law in the United Kingdom
Disability legislation